Gérard Blanc (8 December 1947 – 24 January 2009) was a French singer, guitarist and actor.

Life and career
He began to sing in the 1970s with the band Martin Circus. Then in the 1980s, he participated in the production of Princess Stephanie of Monaco's first album, and started a solo career. He charted four singles in France, including "Du soleil dans la nuit" (#10) and particularly the summer hit "Une Autre Histoire" (#2 in 1987). He went on stage at the Olympia on 20 March 2008.

Solo discography

Albums

 1988 : Ailleurs pour un ailleurs
 1991 : Noir et Blanc
 1995 : À cette seconde-là !
 1999 : Tout blanc
 2003 : Mes Plus Belles Histoires
 2008 : Les Plus Grands Succès de Gérard Blanc & Martin Circus
 2009 : Made in Paris

Singles

Filmography
 Thierry la Fronde (as Renaud)
 1967 : Le Naufrage de Robinet
 1971 : Les bidasses en folie
 1979 : Les Bidasses en vadrouille (as Gérard)
 1997 : Nettoyage à sec (as Bertrand)

References

External links
 
 

1947 births
2009 deaths
French pop singers
20th-century French male actors
French male film actors
French male composers
20th-century French male singers